Following are the results of the 1955 Soviet First League football championship. FC Burevestnik Kishinev and FC ODO Sverdlovsk winning the championship.

Final standings

Zone I

Number of teams by republics

Zone II

Number of teams by republics

See also
 1955 Soviet Class A
 1955 Soviet Cup

References

 1955 at rsssf.com

1955
2
Soviet
Soviet